Callionymus hainanensis, the Hainan deepwater dragonet, is a species of dragonet native to the western Pacific Ocean.  This species grows to a length of  SL.

References 

H
Fish described in 1966
Taxa named by Li Sizhong (ichthyologist)